Nickolas Zukowsky (born 3 June 1998) is a Canadian professional racing cyclist, who currently rides for UCI ProTeam .}

Major results 
2018
 8th Winston-Salem Cycling Classic
 3rd Overall Tour of the Gila
1st  Young rider classification
2019
 1st  Overall Grand Prix Cycliste de Saguenay
1st  Points classification
1st  Young rider classification
 3rd Overall Tour de Beauce
1st  Young rider classification
 9th Chrono Kristin Armstrong
2021
 4th Vuelta a Castilla y León
2022
 2nd Maryland Cycling Classic
 4th Grand Prix Criquielion

References

External links 
 

Canadian male cyclists
Cyclists from Quebec
Sportspeople from Quebec
1998 births
Living people